Churtanlykul (Surtanlıkül) is a rural locality (a village) in Nizhnekaryshevsky Selsoviet, Baltachevsky District, Bashkortostan, Russia. The population was 129 as of 2010. There are 4 streets.

Geography 
Churtanlykul is located 29 km south of Starobaltachevo (the district's administrative centre) by road. Verkhnekaryshevo is the nearest rural locality.

References 

Rural localities in Baltachevsky District